The 2000–01 NBA season was the Pistons' 60th season as a franchise, the 53rd in the National Basketball Association, and the 44th in the Detroit area. During the off-season, retired All-Star guard and Pistons legend Joe Dumars was hired as General Manager, as the team acquired Ben Wallace and second-year guard Chucky Atkins from the Orlando Magic, acquired Cedric Ceballos, Dana Barros and John Wallace from the Dallas Mavericks, and acquired Billy Owens from the Milwaukee Bucks. The team later on signed free agent Joe Smith during the first month of the regular season. However, Ceballos was traded to the Miami Heat in late November after 13 games, as the Pistons acquired Corliss Williamson in exchange for Jerome Williams and Eric Montross in a midseason trade with the Toronto Raptors.

However, the Pistons struggled losing four of their first five games, then after a 13–15 start, they lost 13 of their next 15 games, finishing fifth in the Central Division with a 32–50 record. One key piece to the team's future appeared to be Jerry Stackhouse, who had a stellar season averaging 29.8 points and 5.1 assists per game, while being selected for the 2001 NBA All-Star Game. In addition, Smith averaged 12.3 points and 7.1 rebounds per game, while Atkins contributed 12.0 points and 4.1 assists per game, and Wallace led the team with 13.2 rebounds and 2.3 blocks per game.

Following the season, Smith re-signed with his former team, the Minnesota Timberwolves, while head coach George Irvine was fired, top draft pick Mateen Cleaves was traded to the Sacramento Kings, John Wallace was dealt along with Jud Buechler to the Phoenix Suns, and Owens retired.

Draft picks

Roster

Regular season

Season standings

z - clinched division title
y - clinched division title
x - clinched playoff spot

Record vs. opponents

Game log

Player statistics

Awards and records

Transactions

References

See also
2000-01 NBA season

Detroit Pistons seasons
Detroit
Detroit
Detroit